Ill.Skillz is a drum and bass group formed in Vienna, Austria in 2001. The group is composed of David "D.Kay" Kulenkampff and Philipp "Raw.Full" Roskott who met in 1999 while they were both involved in event promotion with the trife.life! crew.

Releases

LPs

EPs

Singles

Remixes

Featured on

See also
 List of record labels: I–Q

External links
Official website

Ill.Skillz at Urban Artforms
Ill.Skillz feature in Knowledge Magazine
D.Kay feature in Knowledge Magazine
Ill.Skillz feature on Drumandbass.ru (Russian)
D.Kay and Rawfull featured on a Mixmag CD

Interviews
June 2003 interview with D.Kay at Drum & Bass Arena
September 2003 interview with D.Kay at DNB Forum
February 2006 interview with D.Kay at Play.fm

Austrian electronic music groups
Drum and bass duos
Remixers
Musical groups from Vienna